Chopra Assembly constituency is an assembly constituency in Uttar Dinajpur district in the Indian state of West Bengal.

Overview
As per orders of the Delimitation Commission, No. 28 Chopra Assembly constituency covers Chopra community development block and Kamalagaon Sujali gram panchayat of Islampur community development block.

Chopra Assembly constituency is part of No. 4 Darjeeling (Lok Sabha constituency).

Members of Legislative Assembly

Election results

2021

In the 2021 West Bengal Legislative Assembly election, Hamidul Rahman of TMC defeated his nearest rival Md. Shahin Akhtar of BJP.

2016

In the 2016 West Bengal Legislative Assembly election, Hamidul Rahman of TMC defeated his nearest rival Akramul Haque of CPI(M).

2011

In the 2011 election, Hamidul Rahman (Independent) defeated his nearest rival Anwarul Haque of CPI(M).

 

Hamidul Rahman, contesting as an independent candidate, was a rebel Congress candidate from Chopra. He was suspended from the party but the Raiganj MP, Deepa Dasmunsi, campaigned for him. Of the 18 Congress rebels who fought the 2011 assembly elections, Hamidul Rahaman was the only one to win.

.# Change figure based on his own vote percentage as a Congress candidate in 2006.

1977-2006
In the 2006 state assembly elections, Anwarul Haque of CPI(M) won the Chopra assembly seat defeating his nearest rival Hamidul Rahman of Congress. Contests in most years were multi cornered but only winners and runners are being mentioned. Hamidul Rahaman, Independent, defeated Akbar Ali of CPI(M) in 2001. Mahamuddin of CPI(M) defeated Hamidul Rahman of Congress in 1996, Choudhury Md. Manjur Afaque of Congress in 1991 and Shiekh Jalaluddin Ahmad of Congress in 1987. Mahammad Bacha Munshi of CPI(M) defeated Sheikh Jalauddin of Congress in 1982 and Narayan Chandra Sinha, Independent in 1977. Prior to that the constituency did not exist.

References

Assembly constituencies of West Bengal
Politics of Uttar Dinajpur district